Juan Pablo Magallanes Aranda (born 6 February 1982) is a Mexican cyclist.

Major results
Source: 

2003
 9th Gran Premio Industrie del Marmo
2004
 2nd Gran Premio della Liberazione
 2nd Gran Premio Industrie del Marmo
 4th Trofeo Banca Popolare di Vicenza
 8th Giro del Belvedere
2005
 5th Overall Volta ao Alentejo
2006
 1st Stage 5 Vuelta a Chihuahua
2007
 National Road Championships
1st  Road race
1st  Time trial
 Vuelta a El Salvador
1st Points classification
1st Stage 3
 1st Stage 10 Vuelta a Colombia
 10th Overall Tour de Beauce
2008
 2nd Time trial, National Road Championships
 7th Overall Vuelta a Chihuahua
2009
 1st Stage 1 Vuelta Mexico Telmex
 3rd Road race, National Road Championships
 8th Overall Doble Sucre Potosí GP Cemento Fancesa
2012
 1st Stage 2 Ruta del Centro
2013
 Vuelta a Guatemala
1st Stages 1 & 4
 2nd Overall Ruta del Centro
1st Stage 6
 5th Road race, Pan American Road Championships
2014
 10th Road race, Central American and Caribbean Games
2015
 1st Overall Tucson Bicycle Classic
 2nd Time trial, National Road Championships
 3rd  Road race, Pan American Road Championships
2016
 1st  Time trial, National Road Championships
 1st Prologue Ruta del Centro
2020
 3rd Time trial, National Road Championships

References

External links

1982 births
Living people
Mexican male cyclists
Sportspeople from Guanajuato
Cyclists at the 2015 Pan American Games
Pan American Games competitors for Mexico
21st-century Mexican people
20th-century Mexican people